The Universidad Euro Hispanoamericana (UEH) is a  private university locate in the city of Xalapa, political capital of Veracruz state, Mexico,

External links
Official website 

Xalapa
Universities and colleges in Veracruz